Michael Gilmore may refer to:

 Mikal Gilmore (born 1951), American writer and music journalist
 J. Michael Gilmore, U.S. Department of Defense official
 Michael S. Gilmore, American ophthalmologist

See also
 Mike Gilmore (disambiguation)